The Central Committee of the Communist Party of Korea (CPK)(조선공산당 중앙위원회) was elected by the party congress on 14 September 1945, and remained in session until the formation the Workers' Party of South Korea and its Central Committee on 24 November 1946. In between party congresses the Central Committee was the highest decision-making institution in the CPK. The Central Committee was not a permanent institution and delegated day-to-day work to elected bodies, such as the Politburo, Secretariat and the Organisational Bureau in the case of this Central Committee. It convened meetings, known as "Plenary Session of the [term] Central Committee", to discuss major policies. A plenary session could be attended by non-members. These meetings were known as "Enlarged Plenary Session". 

When the North Korean Branch Bureau declared independence from the CPK under the name Communist Party of North Korea, the CPK changed its name as well, into the Communist Party of South Korea.

Meetings
 16 August 1945 
 20 August 1945 
 8 September 1945 
 11–14 September 1945; party Congress. 
 No data available for meetings between 14 September 1945 – 4 September 1946. 
 14 September 1946: preparatory meeting with the People's Party and the New Democratic Party to form the Workers' Party of South Korea.

Members

References

Footnotes

Bibliography

 
 

1st Central Committee of the Workers' Party of South Korea
1945 establishments in Korea
1946 disestablishments in South Korea